PT Indocement Tunggal Prakarsa Tbk. ("Indocement") Indocement is one of the largest cement producers in Indonesia. Today, Indocement and its subsidiaries operate several business units that cover manufacturing and cement sales (core business) and ready-mix concrete, aggregates as well as trass. Indocement has approximately 6,000 employees and 13 factories with annual total production of 24.9 million tons of cement. Ten of its factories are located at Citeureup Factory, Bogor, West Java; two at Cirebon Factory, Cirebon, West Java; and one at Tarjun Factory, Kotabaru, South Kalimantan.

References

External links
 

Manufacturing companies based in Jakarta
Manufacturing companies established in 1975
Cement companies of Indonesia
Indonesian brands
Indonesian companies established in 1975
1980s initial public offerings
Companies listed on the Indonesia Stock Exchange